Aditi Rao Hydari is an
Indian actress who works mainly in Hindi, Tamil and Telugu films. She made her film debut with the Malayalam film Prajapathi (2006). She went on to have major to minor supporting roles in several Hindi films, including the musical romantic drama, Rockstar (2011), the horror-thriller Murder 3 (2013), the thriller Wazir (2016), and the historical period film Padmaavat (2018).

Hydari made her Tamil film debut with Mani Ratnam's Kaatru Veliyidai (2017), for which she won SIIMA Award for Best Debut Actress - Tamil. She received Filmfare Award for Best Actress – Telugu nomination for her Telugu debut Sammohanam (2018). She has since played the lead in several films including Chekka Chivantha Vaanam (2018), Sufiyum Sujatayum (2020), Maha Samudram (2021) and Hey Sinamika (2022).

Background and family 
Aditi Rao Hydari was born in Hyderabad to Ehsaan Hydari and his wife Vidya Rao. Aditi's father, who died in 2013, was a Sulaimani Bohra Muslim. Aditi's mother, Vidya Rao, is a practicing Buddhist who was born the daughter of a Chitrapur Saraswat Brahmin father from Mangalore and a Telugu mother. Hydari is thus of mixed lineage whether in terms of religion (Hindu, Muslim, Buddhist), community (Bohra, Brahmin, Telugu) or language (Konkani, Telugu, Kannada, Urdu).

Both of Hydari's parents belong to the nobility of erstwhile Hyderabad state. Aditi's father, Ehsaan Hydari, was the grandson of Akbar Hydari, sometime Prime Minister of Hyderabad state, and the nephew of Muhammad Saleh Akbar Hydari, former Governor of Assam. Aditi's mother, Vidya Rao, is a classical singer accomplished in the thumri and dadra genres of Hindustani music. Her mother (Aditi's maternal grandmother), Shanta Rameshwar Rao (not to be confused with the writer Shanta Rama Rao), was the founder of Vidyaranya High School in Hyderabad and chairperson of the publishing house Orient Blackswan (owned by her father, the Raja). Shanta Rameshwara Rao was the daughter of J. Rameshwar Rao, last ruling Raja of Wanaparthy. He was one of the four highest-ranking nobleman in the court of the Nizam of Hyderabad. His ancestral Jagir, Wanaparthy, was one of the four largest feudal estates under Hyderabad state; the holders of these estates held the title of "Maharaja." Incidentally, filmmaker Kiran Rao, one of the former wives of actor Aamir Khan, is Aditi's maternal first cousin.

Early and personal life 
Aditi's parents separated when she was two years old, and she has no siblings. While her father remained in Hyderabad, her mother took Aditi with her and moved to New Delhi, giving rise to a bitter legal battle for custody and father's visiting rights. At one point, when Aditi (a mere child) was brought to court by her mother to tell the judge that she did not want to spend any part of her school vacation with her father, the judge felt moved to tell Aditi that she was being "brain-washed" and that she should spend time with her father. However, this did not happen. Due to the bitterness between her parents, Aditi saw little of her father in childhood, and had a difficult relationship with him in her adulthood. After many years, her father remarried, but he never had any other children. Aditi's mother never remarried, but she had an active social life and career, and so, after custody issues abated and Aditi was old enough, she sent Aditi away to boarding school. This was the Rishi Valley School near Madanapalle in Andhra Pradesh. Aditi later graduated from Lady Shri Ram College, University of Delhi.

Hydari spent her early childhood and later school vacations in New Delhi and also Hyderabad, where much of her family lived. She started learning Bharatanatyam at age six and became a student of acclaimed Delhi-based exponent Leela Samson. Hydari uses both of her parents' surnames. She explained, "I wanted to keep both, as my mom has brought me up, but my father is also a part of me. Hydari is a rare name so I kept both Rao and Hydari."

In 2004 and again in 2009, it was reported that Aditi was married to Satyadeep Mishra, an Indian lawyer and former actor. The actress had declined to comment on her marital status in a 2012 interview, but in a 2013 interview, she mentioned that she and Mishra were now separated. Hydari had met Mishra when she was 17 years old, and it was with him that she had her first serious relationship. She married him at the age of 21, but they kept the marriage a secret, since she was trying to be an actress. Although now separated, the two have kept in touch over the years and remain close friends.

Career

Early roles (2004–2009) 
Hydari began her career as a Bharatanatyam dancer, having become interested in the art form following her association with Leela Samson from the age of 11. She worked as a part of Samson's dance group, Spanda, teaching students and travelling through India and abroad to perform in stage events. In early 2004, Hydari completed work on her first acting project titled Sringaram, where she portrayed the lead role of a devadasi, a temple dancer of the 19th century. The Tamil film was directed by Sharada Ramanathan and produced by Padmini Ravi, a noted bharatanatyam dancer. Hydari was offered the role after Ramanathan saw her dance performance at a conference, and was also impressed with her "vulnerable and fresh face" and her resemblance to dancer Shobana. After being screened at numerous international film festivals throughout 2005 and 2006, the film received critical acclaim upon being shown in India and fetched several accolades, including three National Film Awards. Sringaram had a limited theatrical release in October 2007, but won positive reviews, with one critic noting that "the film has brilliant acting from the lead, Aditi Rao".

Her first film to have a theatrical release, however, was the Malayalam film Prajapathi (2006), in which she starred alongside Mammootty. She had been recommended to director Ranjith for the role by actress Suhasini, and was selected after the director managed to get in contact with her through Madhu Ambat, who was the cinematographer of Sringaram. Hydari portrayed an orphan girl who falls in love with the character played by Mammootty, but her role was considered minimal, with a critic from Rediff stating she "has nothing to do with the overall plot". In 2009, she was cast by Rakeysh Omprakash Mehra in his Hindi drama film, Delhi-6, where she portrayed a supporting role of an unmarried woman living in a community where spinsterhood was frowned upon. Featuring in an ensemble cast alongside Abhishek Bachchan and Sonam Kapoor, Hydari was selected by Mehra after he was impressed with her performance in Sringaram.

Career expansion (2009–2015) 

In 2011, Hydari appeared in a role opposite Arunoday Singh in Sudhir Mishra's romantic drama Yeh Saali Zindagi. Portraying the wife of a former convict, the film garnered publicity prior to release for the sensuous scenes between Hydari and Singh. Post-release, Hydari received acclaim for her performance by winning the Screen Award for Best Supporting Actress and subsequently received much larger public attention. She later portrayed a supporting role alongside Ranbir Kapoor in Imtiaz Ali's Rockstar (2011). Hydari initially had met Ali to discuss the leading female role of a Kashmiri girl, but he chose to cast newcomer Nargis Fakhri instead. Ali subsequently contacted her again after two months and signed her to play a supporting role of an impulsive television reporter, who follows the character played by Kapoor. Several of Hydari's scenes in the film were trimmed before its theatrical release, much like her appearance in Delhi-6, and a critic noted her role "suffers due to an undeveloped characterization".

Hydari made a public statement that she wanted to appear in lead roles, rather than portray secondary characters, and subsequently, she was cast in her first lead role in a Hindi film through London, Paris, New York (2012) opposite Ali Zafar. Directed by Anu Menon, the film narrated the tale of a couple who connect with each other in unlikely circumstances in three different cities – London, Paris and New York City. With the film, she made her singing debut by singing two of the songs from the soundtrack. Hydari won predominantly positive reviews for her role of Lalitha, with a reviewer from Sify.com stating Hydari "makes the transition from side actress to leading lady and is instantly impressive", adding she is a "good performer with a striking screen presence" and that "she's likely to go places". Likewise, reviewers from The Hindu and NDTV called her performance "beautiful and in control of her character" and "a delight to watch", respectively. During the period, she also sung the Hindi version of the song "We Are Family" for the Hollywood animation film Ice Age 4: Continental Drift.

In 2013, she became a part of Mahesh Bhatt's Murder franchise, when she was cast as Roshni, opposite Randeep Hooda, in Vishesh Bhatt's directorial film Murder 3. Hydari stated she was keen to do a film which would show the "mysterious and sensual side" to her, away from the several "innocent" roles she had done prior to Murder 3. She received positive reviews for her performance, Taran Adarsh of Bollywood Hungama wrote "Aditi and Sara are show-stoppers" and that "both deliver knockout performances", while Roshni Devi of Koimoi stated that "Aditi's performance is pillar for the film." Hydari then starred alongside Akshay Kumar and Shiv Panditt in the action film Boss (2013) directed by Anthony D'Souza. Describing her role as one of a "quintessential Hindi movie heroine", she revealed that she signed the film owing to Akshay Kumar's popularity and that it was important to be a part of a film which would have a "wide reach". The film received mixed responses from critics but was a box office success. In 2014, Hydari appeared in two guest roles – as a royal princess in the comedy drama Khoobsurat and then as a dancer in the Marathi period drama, Rama Madhav, at the request of choreographer Saroj Khan. She was next seen in the comedy drama, Guddu Rangeela (2015) by Subhash Kapoor, which had an average performance at the box office. For her performance, a reviewer from Rediff wrote Hydari "is perfectly cast as a bright-eyed girl who knows more than she lets on, and the actress looks luminous".

Breakthrough and success (2016–present) 

In 2016, Hydari starred alongside Amitabh Bachchan and Farhan Akhtar in Bejoy Nambiar's crime thriller film Wazir. The film tells the story of two unusual friends, a chess grandmaster who uses a wheelchair, played by Bachchan, and a grief-stricken ATS officer, played by Akhtar. Hydari played the love interest of Akhtar's character. Hydari also garnered praise for her performance. Gayatri Gauri in her review for Firstpost called Hydari's performance a "welcome change from glamorous heroines we usually see on screen." Abhijit Bhaduri of The Times of India said that despite the lack of focus on her character, she did justice to her part by "conveying stuff with her eyes." Ananya Bhattacharya of India Today gave Hydari the highest praise saying that she "brings vulnerability to her Ruhana" added that she "has to her credit several strong sequences."

Hydari next starred in Abhishek Kapoor's romantic drama film Fitoor, along with Tabu, Aditya Roy Kapur and Katrina Kaif. The film based on Charles Dickens' novel Great Expectations, had Hydari play the role of the younger Miss Havisham (later played by Tabu). The film was released on 12 February 2016 to mixed reviews and underperformed at the box-office. However, Hydari garnered praise for her performance. Sarita Tanwar of Daily News and Analysis in her review wrote: "Aditi Rao Hydari does full justice to the part of young Begum", and Surabhi Redkar of Koimoi deemed her "stunning". Her third film of 2016, The Legend of Michael Mishra had a poor response from critics, with the critic from The Times of India noting "Aditi Rao Hydari's good looks is the only good thing about this amateurish attempt, masquerading as a feature film, aimed for adults."

Hydari's first project of 2017, Kaatru Veliyidai, marked her first collaboration with director Mani Ratnam and second film in Tamil Cinema. She played the role of Leela Abraham, a doctor based in Kargil during the 1999 war, who has a tumultuous and abusive relationship with a fighter pilot, played by Karthi. Upon release, Kaatru Veliyidai garnered mixed reviews; though critics predominantly praised the performance of Hydari along with A. R. Rahman's music and Ravi Varman's cinematography. She next appeared as the titular lead in Omung Kumar's Bhoomi, with Sanjay Dutt.

Hydari then played the role of Alauddin Khalji's first wife, Queen Mehrunisa, opposite Ranveer Singh in the epic film Padmaavat directed by Sanjay Leela Bhansali. The film released on 25 January 2018 amidst numerous controversies and protests. Padmaavat received mixed reviews from critics but was a box office success. Hydari received much praise for her portrayal of Mehrunisa.

2018 also marked Aditi's second film with Mani Ratnam and third film in Tamil Cinema with Chekka Chivantha Vaanam. She played Parvathi, one of the eight lead roles. She was paired with actor Arvind Swamy. Meanwhile, her other co-stars of Chekka Chivantha Vaanam included Vijay Sethupathi, Arun Vijay, Silambarasan, Jyothika and Dayana Erappa. The film had a worldwide release on 27 September 2018. She did her Tollywood debut with Sammohanam which was critically acclaimed directed by Mohan Krishna Indraganti. She was nominated for the Filmfare Award for Best Actress – Telugu and SIIMA Award for Best Actress (Telugu). She won Best debut actress award at the Zee Cine Awards Telugu and Special jury award at TSR TV9 awards. Aditi Rao Hydari was also part of Telugu space thriller film Antariksham 9000 KMPH. Hydari next starred in Sudhir Mishra's political thriller film Daas Dev, which is an adaptation of Sarat Chandra Chattopadhyay's 1917 novel Devdas. She essayed the part of Chandramukhi in the film opposite Rahul Bhat.

In 2021, Aditi Rao Hydari's appeared in suspense film The Girl On The Train, directed by Ribhu Dasgupta. The film starring Parineeti Chopra, Kirti Kulhari, Avinash Tiwary, and Sammy Jonas Heaney alongside her, is based on British author Paula Hawkins 2015 novel of the same name. Her next film the same year, was the Netflix film Ajeeb Daastaans, for which she received positive reviews. She next played a cameo role of Young Sardar Kaur in Sardar Ka Grandson. Her final film of the year was Telugu film Maha Samudram.

In 2022, she played Mouna, in the Tamil film Hey Sinamika, It received mixed reviews.

Hydari will next star in Vikramaditya Motwane's web series Jubilee. She will also appear alongside Vijay Sethupathi and Arvind Swamy in the silent film Gandhi Talks.

Filmography

Films

Web series

Dubbing

Discography

Accolades

See also 

 List of Indian film actresses

References

External links 

 
 

Living people
Indian film actresses
Actresses in Hindi cinema
Actresses in Tamil cinema
Actresses from Hyderabad, India
Actresses in Malayalam cinema
Bharatanatyam exponents
21st-century Indian actresses
21st-century Indian dancers
21st-century Indian singers
21st-century Indian women singers
Singers from Hyderabad, India
International Indian Film Academy Awards winners
Screen Awards winners
Actresses in Telugu cinema
Actresses in Marathi cinema
Year of birth missing (living people)
Tyabji family